The Puigdemont Government was the regional government of Catalonia led by President Carles Puigdemont between 2016 and 2017. It was formed in January 2016 after the resignation of Puigdemont's predecessor Artur Mas and it ended in October 2017 with the imposition of direct rule following the Catalan declaration of independence.

History
Following the 2015 regional election incumbent president Artur Mas failed to receive enough support in Parliament to continue in office and was forced to resign in January 2016. An agreement was reached between pro-Catalan independence parties Junts pel Sí (JxSí) and Popular Unity Candidacy (CUP) to replace Mas with Carles Puigdemont. At the investiture vote held on 10 January 2016 Puigdemont secured 70 votes (JxSí 62; CUP 8) with 63 votes against (Cs 25; PSC 16; CatSíqueesPot 11; PP 11) and two abstentions (CUP 2), exceeding the 68 votes necessary for an absolute majority.

In June 2017 Puigdemont announced that a referendum on Catalan independence would be held on 1 October 2017. The Catalan Parliament passed legislation on 6 September 2017 authorising the referendum which would be binding and based on a simple majority without a minimum threshold. The following day Constitutional Court of Spain suspended the legislation, blocking the referendum. The Spanish government put into effect Operation Anubis in order to disrupt the organisation of the referendum and arrested Catalan government officials. Despite this the referendum went ahead though it was boycotted by unionists and turnout was only 43%. 92% of those who voted supported independence. Around 900 people were injured as the Spanish police used violence to try to prevent voting in the referendum.

On 27 October 2017 the Catalan Parliament declared independence in a vote boycotted by opposition MPs. Almost immediately the Senate of Spain invoked article 155 of the constitution, dismissing Puigdemont and the Catalan government and imposing direct rule on Catalonia. The following day Spanish Prime Minister Mariano Rajoy dissolved the Catalan Parliament and called for fresh regional elections on 21 December 2017.

It was composed of members of Democratic Convergence of Catalonia (which was dissolved on 8 July 2016, replaced by the Catalan European Democratic Party on 10 July 2016), Republican Left of Catalonia, and some independents, all part of the JxSí electoral alliance.

Executive Council
The Executive Council consisted of 13 conselleries (ministers) — not including the post of the President — as well as one vice president.

Original members

Member changes

Notes

References

2016 establishments in Catalonia
2017 disestablishments in Catalonia
Cabinets established in 2016
Cabinets disestablished in 2017
Cabinets of Catalonia